ESWAT may refer to:
Cyber Police ESWAT , a 1989 scrolling shooter arcade game developed and published by Sega
ESWAT: City under Siege, a 1990 side scrolling platform video game for the Mega Drive/Genesis video game console
ESWAT, a fictional force in Appleseed and Appleseed Ex Machina, name: Extra Special Weapons and Tactics